Edmund Metatawabin  is a First Nations chief and writer, whose 2014 memoir Up Ghost River: A Chief’s Journey Through the Turbulent Waters of Native History was a shortlisted nominee for the Governor General's Award for English-language non-fiction at the 2014 Governor General's Awards.

A former chief of the Fort Albany First Nation in Ontario, he published Up Ghost River, cowritten with journalist Alexandra Shimo, as a memoir of his childhood experience in Canada's Indian residential schools system.

References

Canadian memoirists
21st-century First Nations writers
Writers from Ontario
Living people
Indigenous leaders in Ontario
Cree people
People from Cochrane District
1948 births
Members of the Order of Canada
21st-century memoirists